Brendan Andolsek Bradley (born May 5, 1983) is an American actor, director, producer, writer and VR performer. He is best known for portraying the advertising character Guy in radio and television commercials for Staples. He has been noted for his work in over 100 television and interactive projects for PBS, CBS, Legendary Entertainment, the Fine Brothers, Comedy Central, the video game Resident Evil: Village and others.

As a writer, he wrote the stage play Jettison, the virtual reality Musical, Non-Player Character, the comedy series Squatters, Video Game Reunion and Non-Transferable and A Tale Told By An Idiot, both films which he also directed. He also served as the director and producer of Assassin's Creed: The Musical, SONA, and Baby X.

He founded The Innovation Lab at New York University's Tisch School of the Arts and is recognized as a pioneer in live immersive theater in virtual reality.

Early life
Bradley was born and raised in Durham, North Carolina. He began appearing in plays at Raleigh Little Theater. During his senior year of high school, he produced his first play.

He co-founded RASH! Theater Company which operated from 2002-2005 producing works, including Goonies: The Musical.

Education 

Bradley graduated from Durham Academy in Durham, North Carolina with a high school degree, and received a Bachelor of Fine Arts Degree with Honors in Theater from New York University's Tisch School of the Arts. While attending New York University, Bradley spent some time in London at the Royal Academy of Dramatic Art studying Shakespeare in Performance.

Career 
Bradley began his career after attending New York University, The Lee Strasberg Institute, and The Royal Academy of Dramatic Art.

Upon moving to Los Angeles, Bradley began producing online commercials before developing his own original, scripted comedy series, Squatters. Squatters caught the attention of National Public Radio's The Story with Dick Gordon and TubeFilter News leading to the 14 episodes launched on DailyMotion as their first original comedy web series.

He began his role as Guy, the quirky, fast-talking Staples clerk in a series of commercials in January 2015, and was Staples national spokesperson.

Bradley’s first play, Jettison, was commissioned by Impetuous Theater Group for Swim Shorts 3, a one act play festival that took place in a rooftop swimming pool in midtown Manhattan. Jettison was published in One Acts of Note in 2009 by Desert Road Publishing, and was produced as part of The Signature Shorts Series at Arsht Center in Miami.

Film & TV 

Filming began in 2009 for the feature film Friends With Benefits, which starred Bradley. He also starred in Redwoods and Love Conquers Paul. Bradley won "Best Actor" award at Methodfest. Shortly after in 2010, Bradley made his television debut with the web series The Legend of Neil, which was syndicated on Comedy Central. Following in 2011, he appeared in the MTV series Death Valley and the series finale of Wizards of Waverly Place.

Bradley appeared in Frankenstein, MD as Eli Lavenza, a modern adaptation of Elizabeth Lavenza, from Mary Shelley's 1818 novel Frankenstein. The web series, produced by PBS Digital Studios and Pemberley Digital, premiered on August 19, 2014, and concluded October 31, 2014. The show aired on domestic and International television in 2017 through a deal with Sinclair Broadcast Group.

Bradley played triplets on CBS’s Elementary in 2015. The same year he appeared on CBS’s legal drama Doubt and Tyler Perry’s The Haves And The Have Nots.

During the period of 2015 to 2017, Bradley portrayed the face-talking salesman named Guy in a series of TV and Radio commercials for Staples, Inc.

In the year 2017, Bradley starred in the film, In Vino, opposite Ed Asner and Sean Young.  After that project his film directorial debut Non-Transferable was released. The film partnered with Turkish Airlines and several YouTube influencers.

In 2018, Bradley appeared on Timeless, American Housewife and reprised his role on The Haves And Have Nots.

In 2022, Bradley’s third feature film screenplay, The Plus One was directed by Erik White, starring Ashanti, Cedric The Entertainer, Michelle Hurd, Cassie Scerbo, and Brendan Bradley.

Digital & Interactive Media
Bradley is the creator, writer, director and star of Squatters, a web series which aired from 2010 to 2012 on DailyMotion as their first original comedy web series.

In 2013, Bradley starred in the viral parody series, School of Thrones as Renly Baratheon. Shortly after in 2014, Bradley directed and produced Assassin’s Creed The Musical for Machinima. The project was acquired by Rooster Teeth in 2019.

After that, in 2016 Bradley created the animated short Baby X, adapted from the short story X: A Fabulous Child’s Story. The 11-minute film received praise from Joe Blevins of The A.V. Club who wrote that its animation style succeeded in mimicking the visual style of its source text, and from Kristina Marusic of NewNowNext, who described it as "both beautiful and poignant". Clips of the film were also used on NPR’s Hidden Brain. In 2019, Bradley created and released a follow-up short film, Baby S.

In the year 2017, he directed, produced and starred in the digital sci-fi series SONA which was picked up by Legendary Entertainment in 2018. A virtual experience was designed by Bradley for the launch at San Diego Comic Con with a virtual reality 6DoF escape room.

In 2018, Bradley began writing, producing and directing A Tale Told By An Idiot, a modern adaptation of Shakespeare’s Macbeth parodying virtual reality and cryptocurrency gaming. The mixed media project experimented with live action film, motion capture and 3D animation.

Bradley appeared in 2020, as a motion capture performer and voice performer in Resident Evil: Village for Capcom.

Virtual Reality 
In 2017, Bradley founded The Innovation Lab at New York University’s Tisch School of the Arts to introduce emerging technologies into live performance training. When schools and theater shut down during COVID-19, the Lab pivoted for students to attend, learn and perform in virtual reality.

Bradley released The Future Stages in July 2020, a free customizable 3D virtual theater experience using the WebXR platform, Mozilla Hubs. In October 2020, he presented his authored play, Jettison, at the Future Stages. The VR play Jettison, became a finalist for The Producer Guild of America’s Innovation Award.

During the 2020 shutdown, Bradley live-streamed a one-man show, seamlessly switching between 5 modes of AR/VR/XR/MR/2D storytelling for The Museum of Science, including live theater in web-based virtual reality (WebVR).

The following year, Bradley was invited to write and perform an interactive musical theater prototype, Non-Player Character, at the Mugar Omni Dome Theater allowing on-site audiences to enter either as a Participant of the VR Concert, wearing a VR headset, or as a seated Spectator of the experience projected onto the IMAX dome screen. Bradley workshopped and expanded the Non-Player Character VR Musical, performing live at FIVARS, Mozilla Festival, winning Best in VR Interactive Immersive Experience at The Queensland (Qld) XR Festival and nominated for The Indie Creator Auggie Award at Augmented World Expo as part of OnBoardXR.

In 2021, Bradley founded and organized OnBoardXR, a seasonal accelerator to scout and support live, immersive creators experimenting with virtual reality in live performance. OnBoardXR uses the Mozilla Hubs web VR platform running custom code on the Amazon Web Services cloud and produced virtual world premieres and speakers at FIVARS, SIGGRAPH and Mozilla Festival. In September 2021 Bradley was included in the 100 Original Voices in XR list created by former Apple and Google developer Avi Bar-Zeev. At that time, he joined the cast of Ferryman Collective’s VRChat play, Severance Theory: Welcome To Respite, performing live at The Venice Film Fest, Raindance Immersive and Kaohsiung Film Festival.

On February 12, 2022 Bradley performed and produced a live Half-time Show in virtual reality at The Polys XR Awards, reported as “the first live halftime show in the metaverse.” On March 12, 2022, he starred in the interactive VR experience Gumball Dreams at SXSW.

Music 
Bradley released his debut single “Reprogram Me” from the Workshop Cast Recording of Non-Player Character on July 8, 2022, debuting at number 25 on the U.S. iTunes Soundtrack chart. An original Workshop cast album recorded at Fever Tree Studios with Producer and Arranger Maurice Soque Jr. was released September 2, 2022.

Filmography

Television

Film

Recognition 
Brendan was interviewed on National Public Radio's The Story with Dick Gordon on September 9, 2009, about his experiences writing and producing online commercials and entertainment. The Method Fest Independent Film Festival recognized his performance in September 12 by giving him the Best Actor Award in 2009.

References

External links 
Official Website

American male film actors
1983 births
Living people
Tisch School of the Arts alumni
Male actors from Durham, North Carolina
Video game actors
Virtual reality pioneers
Male motion capture actors